is a Japanese voice actress affiliated with Aoni Production.

She has voiced various anime characters, including Torpedo Girl of Bobobo-bo Bo-bobo.

Notable voice roles
 Angelic Layer (Yuuko Inada)
 Blue Gender (Minh)
 Bobobo-bo Bo-bobo (Torpedo Girl)
 Crayon Shin-chan: Arashi wo Yobu Eikou no Yakiniku Road (Shitada's wife)
 Slam Dunk (Matsui)
 One Piece (Moodie)

Tokusatsu roles
 Tetsuwan Tantei Robotack (1998) (Baby Elephant Robots)
 Kamen Rider Agito (2001) (Queen Jaguar Lord / Pantheras Magistra) (ep 20-21)
 Hyakujuu Sentai Gaoranger (2001-2002) (Highness Duke Org Rasetsu (Woman Voice)) (ep. 32-49)
 Ninpuu Sentai Hurricanger (2002) (Perfume Ninja Kira-Cologne) (ep. 23)

References
Aoni Production

1972 births
Living people
Voice actresses from Tokyo
Japanese voice actresses
20th-century Japanese actresses
21st-century Japanese actresses
Aoni Production voice actors